Beop of Baekje (died 600) (r. 599–600) was the 29th king of Baekje, one of the Three Kingdoms of Korea.  He was the eldest son of King Hye.  He reigned as Baekje power declined, having lost the Seoul region to the rival Silla kingdom.

He may have chosen his name, which translates as "law king" or "dharma king", to emphasize his identification with the Buddhist faith.  

Beop's brief reign is mostly remembered for his ban on all killing, including hunting and butchering.  He ordered the release of falcons and the burning of fishing and hunting tools. According to the Samguk Yusa, this ban was established in the twelfth lunar month of 599.  

He began construction on the Wangheungsa temple, which was completed late in his successor's reign.

Family
 Father: Hye of Baekje
 Mother: unknown
 Half-sister: Princess Wu Yeong (우영공주, 優永公主, ?–?)
 Queen: unknown
 Son: Jin'ni-Ō (辰爾王, ?–?) – settled in Japan and became ancestor of the Ōuchi clan and Toyota clan.

In popular culture
 Portrayed by Kim Young-ho in the 2005–06 SBS TV series Ballad of Seodong.

See also
Rulers of Korea
History of Korea
Three Kingdoms of Korea
List of Monarchs of Korea

References
  Content in this article was copied from Samguk Sagi Scroll 23  at the Shoki Wiki, which is licensed under the Creative Commons Attribution-Share Alike 3.0 (Unported) (CC-BY-SA 3.0) license.

600 deaths
Baekje rulers
Baekje Buddhists
Korean Buddhist monarchs
6th-century monarchs in Asia
Year of birth unknown